José Miguel Class Ponce (September 26, 1935 – April 13, 2017) was a Puerto Rican singer who garnered international fame during the 1960s and 1970s.

Biography

Nicknamed "El Gallito de Manatí" ("Manati's Bantam"), Class achieved fame in Puerto Rico in the 1960s before moving to Mexico, where he achieved wide success. His period as a resident there proved important for his career: He released various Mexican music albums and he was able to achieve fame across Central America, South America and the rest of the Caribbean.

When Class returned to Puerto Rico during the decade of the '70s, he immediately landed a weekly television show in Rafael Perez Perry's Channel 11, which he co-hosted with Awilda (Awilda La Mimosa) Pedrosa. His adopted Mexican accent was noticeable during the run of this show; as a matter of a fact, he kept the Mexican accent for a very long time. His catchphrase was "Yo soy el Gallo!" ("I am the Rooster!") He  retired to his hometown of Manati. He released over 20 albums, many of which have been converted into CD format.

Death
Class died on the morning of April 13, 2017, aged 81 following a long illness at Auxilio Mutuo Hospital in Hato Rey, Puerto Rico.

Selected discography
Singles
Nuestro Pan De Cada Dia
"Despedida", written by Jose Manuel "Taty" Calderón Hernandez.

References

External links
José Miguel Class biography, National Foundation for Popular Culture, San Juan, Puerto Rico (in Spanish), prpop.org; accessed April 13, 2017.(SEE English translation here)

See also

List of Puerto Ricans
List of Puerto Rican songwriters
Irish immigration to Puerto Rico

1936 births
2017 deaths
People from Manatí, Puerto Rico
21st-century Puerto Rican male singers